Sichuan Women's Volleyball Club is a professional volleyball team which play in Chinese Volleyball League, located in Chengdu, China.

Team member 2013-2014

Former players
 Chen Jing
 Zhao Jing

Chinese volleyball clubs